The Tim Taylor Award may refer to:

Tim Taylor Award (NCAA), awarded annually to the NCAA Ice Hockey National Rookie of the Year
Tim Taylor Award (ECAC Hockey), awarded annually to the best coach of ECAC Hockey

See also
Tim Taylor (ice hockey coach)